The Carp River is a river in the Unorganized North Part of Algoma District in Northeastern Ontario, Canada. The river is in the Great Lakes Basin and is a tributary of Lake Superior.

Course
The river begins at an unnamed lake in geographic Nicolet Township and heads west, then turns south, enters geographic Palmer Township, flows through the Cedar Lakes, and takes in the left tributary East Carp River. It continues south, passes into geographic Fisher Township, takes in the left tributary Carp Creek arriving from Carp Lake, passes under Ontario Highway 17, and reaches Batchawana Bay on Lake Superior.

Recreation
The mouth of the Carp River is at the west end of Batchawana Bay Provincial Park.

Tributaries
Carp Creek (left)
East Carp River (left)

References

Sources

Tributaries of Lake Superior
Rivers of Algoma District